Coleophora adelpha is a moth of the family Coleophoridae. It is found in Mongolia.

The larvae feed on the generative organs of Caragana microphylla.

References

adelpha
Moths of Asia
Moths described in 1979